Townies is an American sitcom that aired on ABC from September to December 1996. Created by Matthew Carlson, the series stars Molly Ringwald, Jenna Elfman, and Lauren Graham.

Synopsis
Set in Gloucester, Massachusetts, Townies follows the lives of three 20-something lifelong friends who work in a restaurant together.

Cast
 Molly Ringwald as Carrie Donovan
 Jenna Elfman as Shannon Canotis
 Lauren Graham as Denise Garibaldi Callahan
Ron Livingston as Curt Pettiglio
 Billy Burr as Ryan Callahan
 Dion Anderson as Mike Donovan
 Conchata Ferrell as Marge
 Lee Garlington as Kathy Donovan
 Joseph D. Reitman as Jesse
 Jeff Doucette as Steve

Episodes

External links
 Townies @ Carsey-Werner.net (en)
 Carsey-Werner - Townies
 
 

1996 American television series debuts
1996 American television series endings
1990s American sitcoms
1990s American workplace comedy television series
American Broadcasting Company original programming
English-language television shows
Television series by Carsey-Werner Productions
Television shows set in Massachusetts